Andre Leon Dozzell (born 2 May 1999) is an English professional footballer who plays as a midfielder for Queens Park Rangers.

Dozzell graduated from the academy at his hometown club Ipswich Town, scoring on his senior debut in 2016. He has won caps for England at youth levels form U16 up to U20, helping England U19 to win the 2017 UEFA European Under-19 Championship. He remained at Ipswich for five years, making over 90 appearances, before joining Queens Park Rangers in 2021.

Club career

Ipswich Town
Dozzell is a product of the Ipswich Town youth academy. Born in Ipswich, he joined the youth set-up at his home town club at the age of eight. He worked his way through the youth system at Ipswich, signing his first scholarship with the club in 2013. In April 2016, he was rewarded for his fine form in Ipswich's youth squads with the club's Academy Player of the Year award for the 2015–16 season. On 16 April 2016, Dozzell made his professional debut for Ipswich Town aged 16 in a Championship match against Sheffield Wednesday at Hillsborough, coming on as a substitute at half-time. He scored the equalizing goal for Ipswich on his first-team debut, his first senior goal, matching his father Jason's achievement of scoring on his senior debut, also for Ipswich at the age of 16 in 1984. He made his first league start in the following league match against Fulham on 19 April, in a 1–1 draw at Portman Road.

Upon turning 17 in May 2016, Dozzell signed his first professional contract with Ipswich, signing a two-year contract, a deal which had initially been agreed in principle upon signing his academy scholarship in 2013. He made nine appearances in total during the following season, including six league starts.

Dozzell signed a new three-year contract on his 18th birthday, on 2 May 2017, keeping him at the club until 2020, with the option of an additional year's extension. On 5 August 2017, Dozzell tore his cruciate ligament during the opening game of the 2017–18 season against Birmingham City at Portman Road, and was ruled out for the rest of the 2017–18 season.

After recovering from the cruciate ligament injury he suffered at the start of the 2017–18 season, Dozzell returned to first-team action during the 2018 pre-season, featuring regularly in friendly matches while completing his injury rehabilitation. He made his return to the Ipswich first-team on 2 October 2018, featuring as a second-half substitute in a match against Middlesbrough, his first appearance in over a year. Dozzell saw his first-team involvement increase during the 2018–19 season, making 21 appearances in all competitions, including scoring in a 3–2 victory over Leeds United at Portman Road in the final game of the season.

He made his first appearance of the 2019–20 season as a substitute in a 1–1 draw with Sunderland on 10 August. After finding regular game time harder to come by during the early part of the season, he scored his first goal of the season on 9 November, scoring the equalising goal in a 1–1 draw with Lincoln City in an FA Cup first round tie at Portman Road. He found game time limited during the 2019–20 season, starting only 8 games in the league. In total, he made 15 appearances over the course of the season, scoring once. On 5 May 2020, Ipswich took up the option to extend Dozzell's contract by a further year, keeping him at the club until 2021.

Dozzell managed to force his way into a starting position in the first-team from early on in the 2020–21 season, changing his role to play primarily as a holding midfielder. He played every minute of the opening 11 league games of the season, until receiving a 72nd minute red card in a match against Sunderland at the Stadium of Light on 3 November, resulting in a three-match suspension. After serving his three-match suspension, he returned to the first-team on 28 November, starting in a 0–2 loss to Charlton Athletic. On 4 December 2020, it was announced that Dozzell had signed a new three-year contract with Ipswich. Dozzell finished the season having made 46 appearances, more than any other Ipswich player during the season, whilst also making more starts than any other player.

Queens Park Rangers
On 15 June 2021, Dozzell joined Championship club Queens Park Rangers on a three-year contract for an undisclosed fee.

International career
In August 2014, Dozzell was called up to the England U16 squad, having previously been involved in a training camp with the England under-15 set up in January 2014. He made his debut for the under-16's on 20 August 2014, captaining England in a 4–3 friendly defeat to Belgium at St George's Park. He scored his first international goal on 7 November 2014, netting the winner in a 1–0 win over Northern Ireland, with a free kick from 25 yards out. He won 9 caps for England's under-16's between 2014 and 2015, scoring once, whilst also being a part of the squad that won the 2015 Montaigu Tournament.

Dozzell made his England U17 debut on 26 August 2015, in a 3–1 win over Italy at the New Bucks Head stadium, creating the opening goal for Liverpool's Adam Lewis. He scored his first goal for the U17s in a 2–1 win over Turkey on 28 August 2015. Dozzell captained England at U17 level during the 2015–16 season. He was a member of the squad for the 2016 UEFA European Under-17 Championship, starting the Quarter-final defeat against Spain. He won 16 caps at under-17 level between 2015 and 2016, scoring 3 goals.

He made his debut for the England U18 team in a 2–1 win over Italy on 1 September 2016, coming on as a 60th minute substitute for Manchester City's Sadou Diallo. Dozzell won 9 caps for England's under-18 side between 2016 and 2017.

In July 2017 Dozzell played up an age group to win the 2017 UEFA European Under-19 Championship. He made 4 appearances during the tournament, including starting in the 2–1 victory over Portugal in the final of the tournament.

He made his England U20 debut on 15 October 2018, in a 1–1 draw with the Czech Republic. He won his second cap for the under-20 side on 19 November, starting in a 2–0 win over Germany. His third cap came in a 3–1 loss to Poland on 22 March 2019 in the 2018–19 Under 20 Elite League.

In August 2019, Dozzell was once again called up to the England U20 squad for friendlies against Netherlands and Switzerland. He won his fourth cap for the U20s on 5 September, starting in a 0–0 draw with the Netherlands at the New Meadow stadium. He won his fifth cap on 9 September, featuring as a second-half substitute in a 1–0 victory over Switzerland in Basel.

Personal life
Andre is the son of former professional footballer Jason Dozzell. He is of American descent through his paternal grandfather.

Career statistics

Honours

International 
England U16
Montaigu Tournament: 2015
England U19
UEFA European Under-19 Championship: 2017

Individual 
Ipswich Town Young Player of the Year: 2015–16

References

External links
Andre Dozzell profile at the Ipswich Town F.C. website

1999 births
Living people
Sportspeople from Ipswich
English footballers
Association football midfielders
Ipswich Town F.C. players
Queens Park Rangers F.C. players
English Football League players
England youth international footballers
English people of American descent